The 2012–13 FC Kuban Krasnodar season was the second successive season that the club played in the Russian Premier League, the highest tier of football in Russia. They also participated in the 2012–13 Russian Cup, being knocked out at the quarter-final stage by Zenit St. Petersburg on penalties after a 0–0 draw.

They started the season with Dan Petrescu as manager; however, he resigned on 14 August 2012 to take over as Dynamo Moscow manager. He was replaced by Yuri Krasnozhan, who himself was fired on 9 January 2013, after five months in charge due to irreconcilable differences with the owners. He was replaced by Leonid Kuchuk, who left Arsenal Kyiv to take over.

Squad
As of 16 February 2013, according to the Russian Premier League official website. 

 (C)

Transfers

Summer

In:

Новости. Футбол - трансферы - россия. СЭ: "Кубань" купила Никулае. Спорт-Экспресс.

Out:

Новости. Футбол - трансферы - россия. СЭ: "Томь" подпишет Бендзя и Горбанца. Спорт-Экспресс
За «Волгарь» заявлен Антон Секрет

Winter

In:

Out:

Competitions

Russian Premier League

Results by round

Matches

League table

Russian Cup

Matches

Squad statistics

Appearances and goals

|-
|colspan="14"|Players away from Kuban Krasnodar on loan:|-
|colspan="14"|Players who left Kuban Krasnodar during the season:''

|}

Top scorers

Disciplinary record

References

FC Kuban Krasnodar seasons
Kuban Krasnodar